Leitch Technology International Inc. was a corporation with registered address in Toronto, Ontario.  On August 31, 2006, Leitch amalgamated into Harris Corporation. 

Seven years later, in December 2012, Harris sold the division to the Gores Group for US$225 million.

References

External links
Leitch Technology Corporation's web site (via internet.org captured webpages)

Electronics companies of Canada
Manufacturing companies of Canada
Canadian companies established in 1971
2006 mergers and acquisitions